An age verification system, also known as an age gate, is a technical protection measure used to restrict access to digital content from those who are not appropriately-aged. These systems are used primarily to restrict access to content classified (either voluntarily or by local laws) as being inappropriate for users under a specific age, such as alcohol and tobacco advertising, internet pornography or other forms of adult-oriented content, video games with objectionable content, or to remain in compliance with online privacy laws that regulate the collection of personal information from minors (such as COPPA in the United States).

Methods

Birth date  
The most basic form of age verification is to ask users to input their date of birth on a form. However, this depends on an honor system that assumes the validity of the end user (which can be a minor who fraudulently inserts a valid date that meets the age criteria, rather than their own), and has thus been described as ineffective.

Credit card verification 
More sophisticated age verification systems require users to provide credit card information. However, this depends on an assumption that the vast majority of credit card holders are adults, because U.S. credit card companies did not originally issue cards to minors. Additionally, a minor may still attempt to obtain their parent's credit card information, or defraud users into divulging their credit card number to an individual to use for their own purposes, defeating the stated purpose of the system.

In 2005, Salvatore LoCascio pleaded guilty to charges of credit card fraud; one of his schemes had involved using credit card-based age verification systems to charge users for "free" tours of adult entertainment websites.

Federated identification 
MindGeek, a major operator of porn websites, operates an age verification provider known as AgeID. First introduced in Germany in 2015, it uses third-party providers to authenticate the user's age, and a single sign-on model that allows the verified identity to be shared across any participating website.

Face recognition 
The Australian government has proposed the use of facial recognition against official identification photos.

Knowledge 
The adult-oriented video game franchise Leisure Suit Larry presented players with trivia questions that, in the opinion of franchise creator Al Lowe, a child would not know the answer to (such as, for example, "All politicians are: a. hard-working, b. honest, c. on the public payroll"), in order to launch the game (although this can be bypassed with a keyboard shortcut).

Legal mandates

Germany 
In Germany age verification systems are mandated by the "Jugendmedienschutz-Staatsvertrag" which was introduced in September 2002. The institution in charge KJM considers only systems equivalent to face-to-face verification as sufficient for age verification.

United Kingdom 
With the passing of the Digital Economy Act 2017, the United Kingdom passed a law containing a legal mandate on the provision of age verification. Under the act, websites that publish pornography on a commercial basis would have been required to implement a "robust" age verification system. The British Board of Film Classification (BBFC) was charged with enforcing this legislation. After a series of setbacks, the planned scheme was eventually abandoned in 2019.

While the UK government abandoned this legislation, age verification continues to be monitored and enforced by regulatory bodies including Ofcom and the ICO. Other standards are emerging for age assurance systems, such as PAS1296:2018. The ISO standard for age assurance systems (PWI 7732) is also being developed by the Age Check Certificate Scheme, the Age Verification Providers’ Association, and other Conformity Assessment Bodies.

China Mainland Region (中國大陸地區） 
Main article : Real-name system

The age verification system in China, also known as the "real name system" (實名認證), was created by the mainland Chinese government. The intended aim of this system in regards to the video game industry is to protect minors from video game addiction.

References

Identity documents
Censorship of pornography
Age verification
Internet censorship